A parking pawl is a device fitted to a motor vehicle's automatic transmission that locks up the transmission when the transmission shift lever selector is placed in the Park position. "Park" is the first position of the lever (topmost on a column shift, frontmost on a floor shift) in all cars sold in the United States since 1965 (when the order was standardised by the Society of Automotive Engineers (SAE)) through SAE J915, and in most other vehicles worldwide.

Design and operation
The parking pawl locks the transmission's output shaft to the transmission casing by engaging a pawl (a pin) that engages in a notched wheel on the shaft, stopping it (and thus the driven wheels) from rotating. The main components of a parking pawl mechanism are the parking gear, parking pawl, actuator rod, cam collar, cam plate, pivot pin, and parking pawl return spring. The mechanism assembly is designed so that the parking pawl tooth collides and overrides the parking gear teeth (ratchets) until a safe engagement speed for the vehicle is reached. Software controls are put in place to avoid this condition and engage the pawl only when the vehicle has come to a standstill.

Applicable standards
FMVSS 114 – Theft Protection and Rollaway Prevention, Keyless Ignition Systems 
SAE J2208 – Park Standard for Automatic Transmissions.

Recommendations
Most vehicle manufacturers and auto mechanics do not recommend using the transmission's parking pawl as the sole means of securing a parked vehicle, instead recommending it should only be engaged after first applying the vehicle's parking brake. Constant use of only the parking pawl, especially when parking on a steep incline, means that driveline components, and transmission internals, are kept constantly under stress, and can cause wear and eventual failure of the parking pawl or transmission linkage.  The pawl might also fail or break if the vehicle is pushed with sufficient force if the parking brake is not firmly engaged.  Replacement can be an expensive operation since it not only requires removing the transmission from the vehicle, but it's usually the first component to be installed in the gearbox case during a complete rebuild. 

It is highly inadvisable to use the parking pawl to stop a vehicle in motion.  Modern parking pawls are connected to a safety mechanism that prevents the pawl from engaging unless the vehicle is stopped first.  The pawl mechanism is generally not strong enough to stop a vehicle in motion if it engages at all.  Under that much stress, the pawl may simply break off in the transmission, leading to costly repairs.

See also
 Electronic parking brake
 Park by wire
 Transmission brake

External links
 Automatic transmission parking pawl for the 2004 Subaru Impreza
 Design Requirements for Parking Pawl
 Video of Parking Pawl in an automatic transmission

References

Automotive transmission technologies
Vehicle braking technologies